Davan (also Romanized as Davān, Dawan, and Dovān) is a village in Deris Rural District, in the Central District of Kazerun County, Fars Province, Iran. In the Davani dialect it is pronounced : do'u At the 2006 census, its population was 601, in 178 families.

Davan in situated in a narrow valley at the foot of Mount Davān in the greater Zagros range. It is divided into upper (maʿale[maḥalla]-ye bār) and lower (ma ale [maḥalla]-ye duman) quarters. Some ruins dating from the Parthian and Sasanian periods are located approximately 4 km to the south of the village.

Climate
The climate is hot and dry. In the 1970s, the only source of water was a group of nine springs located at the southeastern end of the village.

Agriculture
Arable land is very limited and located mostly in the foothills; dry farming is the prevailing form of agriculture. Products include barley, wheat, and fruits: grapes, figs, pomegranates, and pears (called xormor in Davani). In 1975 AD (1354 AP)  there were thirty-three orchards.

Language
The Davani dialect is a Southwestern Iranian language that is spoken in this village.

History
Davan is one of the oldest villages of Iran. It is located in south west of Fars Province in the Kazerun County, and also is surrounded by the Zagros Mountains. It has often been asserted that Davan was founded around 500 B.C. The fact that there is a fire temple which gives grounds for believing that its history can be traced back at least as far as Achaemenian Era. The Davani dialect is rooted in Iranian language which is considered to belong to the Indo-Iranian family of languages. This dialect is still one of the most pure ancient dialect in Iran. Davan is definitely behind Shahpor king Cave near Kazeroun City.
The Sassanid Empire (also spelled Sasanid Empire, Sassanian Empire, or Sasanian Empire), known to its inhabitants as Ērānshahr and Ērān, was the last pre-Islamic Persian Empire, ruled by the Sasanian Dynasty from 224 to 651. The Sassanid Empire, which succeeded the Parthian Empire, was recognized as one of the two main powers in Western Asia and Europe, alongside the Roman Empire and later the Byzantine Empire, for a period of more than 400 years.
The Empire was founded by Ardashir I, after the fall of the Arsacids and the defeat of the last Arsacid king, Artabanus IV. The Empire lasted until Yazdegerd III lost control of his empire in a series of invasions from the Arab Caliphate. During its existence, the Sassanid Empire encompassed all of today's Iran, Afghanistan, Iraq, Syria, the Caucasus (Armenia, Georgia, Azerbaijan and Dagestan), southwestern Central Asia, part of Turkey, certain coastal parts of the Arabian Peninsula, the Persian Gulf area, and areas of southwestern Pakistan. The name for the Sassanid Empire in Middle Persian is Eran Shahr which means Aryan Empire. He vexilloid of the Sassanid Empire was the Derafsh Kaviani.

From West to East Davan village of the land like Nvdan, Tarh Davn Strait between bat and surrounded it in the west coast from north to south from this land is surrounded by: Strait from the south polo, Haji Abad, Sultan Abad Amir Abad and Kazeroun city. In its southern coast from East to West and surrounded by land from the city Kazerun Dyank and north to south, with areas such as Papvn, Dyank Mvrdk and is enclosed. � Zagros Mountains from northwest to southeast Iran drawn up and follow the mountain trail in the Persian Gulf has given you. Davan among the mountains of northern plains Kazerun that consists of several fields located in Davan area has special status and geographic diversity is climate. Davan so that plain, the winter temperature reaches zero degrees and the summer is hot and dry at this point. Can be said that the best region in terms of climate is a village in Davan. For example, in one hand, with dozens of spring water that they used was old and off the bat reaches the Strait. � The climate division, Davan can be hot and dry land areas into account during the winter and the temperature may reach below zero and during summer, temperatures to 45 degrees is too high. Davan due to dry weather, the humidity level in this area during the four periods of 20 to 25 percent is variable and thus, has very little annual precipitation. Although severe winter rainfall on the 86 most affected parts of Fars province and the air is very cool, but if you go to the third week of February, Davan'll tell you, wearing warm clothing was a bit annoying. The Davan area is rich in vegetation and other areas close to the Zagros more varied vegetation that cause a variety of jobs has been among the people. � Davani believe that if the wind clouds lead to the West, it will be clouds and rain throughout the year, four different types of wind that blows Davan Davani to each name are: �1) Rashnh during the winter from the mountains northeast of blows and Davani believe that if this wind Bvzd, Prbarsh sign that winter is coming. �2) hollow in winter is blowing from the north, broken trees and their fruit damage. �3) fall in the autumn blows and why leaves puts all trees. �4) that flower in the spring blows. During the history of Davan, the people first were believed on Zoroastrian faith. When the Muslim Arabs entered Fars in the seventh century A.D., Davanis became Muslims. At first, they were Sunni Muslims, but later in the sixteenth century A.D., they turned to Shiite (Shiite) Muslims. A Muslim philosopher, as well as politician, Jalal-Addin Muhammad Davani was born in Davan and his mausoleum is in that village. Davan village for being a steep stair is almost so that in many rural parts of the yard of a house with a roof Hmtraz home village is poor, although Davan has a homogeneous culture, but physically separate from the second place (Place top and bottom) consists of a long street with steep from East to West boundary between two places can set. Cultural centrality of the village's pre-Islamic fire temple was a monument known as Sheikh today is excellent. The cultural centrality of the physical construction has impacted villages. Tomb of King Solomon after Islam formed the village center and fire temple after becoming the tomb of the fifth century AH Davan scholars after a village has two cultural centrality. Davan village architecture because of elements such as stone, wood, gypsum, lime a lot of villages and the surrounding environment is found, a special Islamic period architecture and city to display Kazerun leaves. Because of the mountainous region being the main raw material of stone architecture that Davan can provide immense found. Oak roof to roof clay, gypsum, which has been used as mortar, raw material from the surrounding hills Kazerun that mine are made very wide, lime latest materials used in architecture is home. Tomb of Sheikh Chhartaqy remains high among the Sassanid era that the hyper-dome located in the Islamic period and added to the north side of the circuit can be seen. Into the fabric of village houses and steep streets has led facilities services - welfare to be slow. This village of just the ring of mountains located and Nature Tourism and more attractive for tourists has created. After World War II, they began to migrate to other cities of Iran, Kuwait and other parts of the world were. After immigrating Davani never forget his hometown and always Brand Davan Consider and it helps while migration also always continues. � Davan people want them as far as is possible in the development of the partnership and so Davan can be one of the most developed villages in Iran have said that at least two roads, three schools, health centers, various shops, water supply network, electric facilities, the center post and telephone. Each year in the hot summer days, Davani from around the world come to visit Davan and those who are still staying in the village meet.

References

External links

Encyclopedia Iranica article on Davan
davan.info
davan.ir
bakhshandeh.ir

Populated places in Kazerun County